Laughter yoga (Hasyayoga) is a modern exercise involving prolonged voluntary laughter. This type of yoga is based on the belief that voluntary laughter provides similar physiological and psychological benefits as spontaneous laughter. It is usually done in groups, with eye contact and much playfulness between participants. Intentional laughter often turns into real and contagious laughter.

Laughter yoga was popularized by family physician Madan Kataria who modernized and simplified the work of earlier laughter pioneers,  who taught very similar concepts starting in the 1960s. Madan Kataria wrote about his experience in his 2002 book Laugh For No Reason.

Laughter yoga is found in 53 countries. There are about 5,000 laughter yoga clubs worldwide, with roughly 200 of those in the United States.

Method
The yoga is performed without any humorous reason to laugh, with one practitioner observing that "the mind does not know that we’re faking it."

Laughter yoga sessions may start with gentle warm-up techniques which include stretching, chanting, clapping, eye contact and body movement, to help break down inhibitions and encourage a sense of playfulness. Breathing exercises are used to prepare the lungs for laughter, followed by a series of ‘laughter exercises’ that combine the method of acting and visualization techniques with playfulness. Laughter exercises are interspersed with breathing exercises.

Benefits
A 2018 review concludes that group interventions based on laughter Yoga  improved depressive symptoms over the short term, but there is no good quality evidence to assess that laughter yoga is more effective than other group-based intervention.

A 2019 review and meta-analysis in the field of laughter-inducing therapies suggests that they are more effective than humorous laughter and can improve depression. However, the quality of the evidence was low.

A meta-analysis published in 2020 concludes that laughter yoga has no adverse effect and could have benefit for older adults in terms of physical function (blood pressure, cortisol level, sleep quality) and psychosocial health (life satisfaction, quality of life, loneliness, death anxiety, depression, mood, happiness). Seven publications were included in this meta-analysis, selected on a base of 3210.

See also
Study of laughter
 World Laughter Day

References

Hasyayog Guru Jiten Kohi (May 2008) written book "Hasyayoga Vigyan" published in Hindi vide ISBN No. 978-81-906189-0-8
Hasyayog Guru Jiten Kohi (September 2008) written book "Urja Ke Panch Stort aur Hasyayoga" published in Hindi vide ISBN No. 978-81-906189-1-5
Hasyayog Guru Jiten Kohi (December 2010) written book "Hasyayoga Sanhita" published in Hindi & English vide ISBN No. 978-81-906189-6-0

Further reading
 Birklbauer, Walter (2011), Why Laughter Yoga or The Guitar Method: A Neurologic View, 
The Laughing Club of India documentary by Mira Nair about the club founded by Madan Kataria

Yoga styles 	
Yoga